This article summarises the results and overall performances of Australia at the FIFA World Cup.

Australia has qualified for the FIFA World Cup's tournament phase on six occasions: in 1974, 2006 and the four tournaments since. They have also attempted to qualify for the FIFA World Cup 15 times, with their first attempt being in 1966 when they lost to North Korea.

In Australia's first appearance in 1974, representing OFC, a team made up entirely of amateurs secured a scoreless draw against Chile, though eventually departed from the tournament without a goal to show from their inaugural appearance. Australia made up for lost time at Germany 2006 and qualified for the Round of 16 before narrowly falling to eventual champions Italy. The German theme continued at South Africa 2010 although this time Australia, now representing the AFC, suffered a 4–0 loss against the European giants in a scoreline which ultimately scuppered their progress. A ten-man 1–1 draw against Ghana and a 2–1 win against Serbia saw Australia eliminated on goal difference, three goals off the Africans. Australia were to lose all three games in a tough group at Brazil 2014. In the Qatar 2022 edition, Australia made it to the last 16 for only the second time, before falling 2–1 to Argentina, which, like what happened to 2006 Italy, Argentina would eventually claim the World Cup title in 2022.

FIFA World Cup record

By match

Record by opponent

Games against West Germany are included in the statistics of Germany.

1974 FIFA World Cup

Group 1

2006 FIFA World Cup

Group F

Note 1: Šimunić was given three yellow cards in the match: the referee (Graham Poll) failed to send him off the pitch after the second yellow, and was only red carded after the third yellow.

Round of 16

2010 FIFA World Cup

Group D

2014 FIFA World Cup

Group B

2018 FIFA World Cup

Group C

2022 FIFA World Cup

Group D

Round of 16

Goalscorers

 Own goals scored for opponents
 Colin Curran (scored for East Germany in 1974)
 Aziz Behich (scored for France in 2018)

Most appearances

See also
Australia national soccer team records
Australia at the AFC Asian Cup

References

 
Countries at the FIFA World Cup